The medial pontine reticular formation (MPRF) is a part of the human brain located in the pons of the brainstem (specifically the central pontine reticular formation). It plays a critical function in the generation of REM sleep.

Role in REM sleep
GABAergic neurons of the MPRF are activated by Acetylcholine (released by the Pedunculopontine tegmental nucleus), and in turn activate cells in the basal forebrain -- namely the Dorsal raphe nucleus (which produces serotonin) and the Locus coeruleus (which produces Norepinephrine). This activation will stimulate cortical activity, which is characteristic of the low amplitude / high frequency EEG patterns observed during REM sleep. As well, lesions of the MPRF will cause a great decrease of REM sleep.

References

Pons